Scilla is a town and comune in Calabria, Italy, administratively part of the Metropolitan City of Reggio Calabria.  It is the traditional site of the sea monster Scylla of Greek mythology.

Description
The town,  from the city of Reggio, lies in front of the strait of Messina, and is composed of two parts: the downtown, where the town offices and the residence of the patron saint are situated, and Marina di Scilla, the beach-front, populated by tourists and thus heavily characterized by hotels and restaurants.
Its beach is the first place north of Reggio Calabria where the waters are not cooled by the strait draughts.

Scilla's coastal district of Chianalea is included in the I Borghi più belli d'Italia association of small Italian towns of historical interest list.

The Ruffo Castle, a fortress built by the Dukes of Calabria, overlooks the beach. On a seaward-facing terrace is Scilla Lighthouse, an important aid to ships entering the Strait of Messina from the north.

History
It is said that Tyrrhenian pirates were the first to settle this coastal area in 493 BC, but others claim it was already settled during the time of the Trojan Wars in the 12th century BC.

The town of Scilla has ancient origins that relate mainly to the period of the destruction of Troy and invokes the myths and legends of Ulysses with Scylla and Charybdis, of Homer and Dante Alighieri.
The town's name derives from the mythological figure of Scylla, a young nymph who refused Glauco's love. He thus went to the sorceress Circe, who was in love with him, and asked her to help him win Scylla's heart. The offended sorceress poisoned the sea-pool where the nymph used to bathe, turning her into a horrific six dog-headed monster who destroyed every ship crossing the Strait of Messina. Scylla is said to live in the rock of Scilla, which the Castello di Ruffo sits on.

In 1806, during the British expedition to Sicily to oppose the French invasion of Naples, the Castle of Scilla was twice besieged.

Geography
The municipality of Scilla includes the subdivisions Favazzina, Melia, and Solano Superiore.

Scilla borders the municipalities of Bagnara Calabra and Villa San Giovanni.

Scilla lays across the Strait of Messina, with Sicily observable from the town. When visibility is clear, the island of Stromboli can also be seen.

Twin towns
Scilla has been twinned with the following:
 Ħamrun, Malta

In popular culture
Scilla is one of two primary settings in Elizabeth Street, a 2009 historical novel by Laurie Fabiano that tells of the experiences of a family who emigrates from Scilla to New York City's Little Italy neighborhood in the early 20th century. Based on the author's family history, it includes a detailed description of the 1908 earthquake and tsunami.

Transport
The town is served by a station on the Salerno-Reggio Calabria railway.

Main roads include the A2 Salerno-Reggio motorway and the Strada statale 18 Tirrena Inferiore.

Gallery

See also
 Scilla Lighthouse
 Scyllaeum
 Calabrian wine

References

External links

 

Scilla, Calabria
Castles in Italy